Dwaine R. Caraway (born April 30, 1952) is a former American politician and convicted felon who served as the 60th mayor of Dallas in 2011, in an interim capacity. He pleaded guilty in 2018 for taking bribes while serving as mayor pro tem. He served as a Dallas City Council member until his resignation on August 9, 2018.
 
Caraway was first elected as a city council member in 2007. His wife Barbara Mallory Caraway had previously served on the city council. In 2011, Caraway became acting mayor after Mayor Tom Leppert resigned to campaign for the U.S. Senate. Caraway's first meeting with the Dallas City Council was on March 2, 2011. He served as interim mayor until June 26, 2011, when he was succeeded by elected mayor Mike Rawlings.

Caraway left the city council in 2015 due to consecutive term limits, but was elected again in 2017. He was replaced in a special election by Carolyn King Arnold, who was elected to his seat in 2015.

Caraway is a graduate of Roosevelt High School in Dallas and attended Texas Southern University for 2 years.
Caraway served as a Dallas City Council member representing District 4.

On October 30, 2019, Caraway was transferred to the Dallas County jail after a short stay at the West Texas federal prison.
Caraway is a member of the Kappa Alpha Psi fraternity.

His wife, Barbara, is a former Dallas City Council Member and a former member of the Texas House of Representatives.

Controversy 
In 2011, Caraway drew sharp criticism for his attempt to honor convicted felon Michael Vick by presenting him with a ceremonial key to the City of Dallas. On February 22, 2016, Dwaine Caraway was involved in a melee with Dallas County commissioner John Wiley Price at the gospel radio station KHVN Heaven 97. A volunteer for Dwaine Caraway's campaign was allegedly assaulted by John Wiley Price. The alleged assault resulted in the filing of a civil suit in Dallas County against Mr. Price by Dallas attorney Kristin Regel.

On February 23, 2016, he apologized on K104 Hip Hop & R&B for his behavior.

On January 25, 2018, local news in Dallas reported that Caraway was linked to Slater Swartwood, a businessman facing prison time for bribing public officials.  Dallas television station NBCDFW questioned Caraway about his receipt of payments from Swartwood who had testified that he directed payments to Caraway in exchange for Caraway's support of Swartwood's company, Elf Investments, getting contracts from the city.  The alleged payments occurred when Caraway was a member of the Dallas city council. On August 9, 2018, Caraway pleaded guilty to federal corruption charges including criminal conspiracy, wire fraud and tax evasion.

On February 20, 2018, reported in national news from Dallas, Texas that Mayor Pro Tem Caraway requested that the NRA move its annual convention outside of Dallas  Actual video of Mayor Pro Tem Caraway press conference referenced here.

On August 9, 2018, Caraway filed court documents indicating that he will plead guilty to federal corruption charges.  The charges relate to $450,000 in payments from figures associated with Force Multiplier Solutions, a school bus "stop sign camera" company that received a lucrative contract from the since-dissolved bus operator Dallas County Schools.
Former Dallas Mayor Pro Tem Dwaine Caraway began serving his 56-month sentence at a West Texas federal prison Tuesday, May 7, 2019.

Caraway was sentenced to serve 56 months in prison in April and ordered to pay more than $500,000 in restitution

References 

Living people
Mayors of Dallas
African-American mayors in Texas
African-American people in Texas politics
Texas Southern University alumni
1952 births
Texas politicians convicted of crimes
21st-century African-American people
20th-century African-American people